Black Diamond (s) or The Black Diamond may refer to:

Minerals
 Hematite
 Anthracite
 Carbonado, a black tinted natural diamond 
 Boron carbide
 A black synthetic diamond, specifically CVD polycrystalline diamonds or HPHT polycrystalline compact diamonds

Animals
 Black Diamond (buffalo) (born 1893), name of the North American bison featured on the reverse of the buffalo nickels circulated from 1913 to 1938
 Black Diamond (elephant) (1898–1929), Indian elephant

Books
 The Black Diamond (novel), a 1921 British novel by Francis Brett Young
 Black Diamond: The Story of the Negro Baseball Leagues, a 1994 book by Patricia and Fredrick McKissack
 Black Diamonds: The Aboriginal and Islander Sports Hall of Fame, a 1996 book, incorporating the first round of the Aboriginal and Islander Sports Hall of Fame project

Business and transportation
 Black Diamond (bus brand), a brand name used by Diamond Bus in the United Kingdom
 Black Diamond (custom car), winner of the 1978 Ridler Award
 Black Diamond (train), Reading RR-Lehigh Valley RR passenger train
 Black Diamond Cheese, a Canadian cheese manufacturing company
 Black Diamond Coal Mining Company, a coal mining company that operated in California, Oregon, and Washington
 Black Diamond Railroad, a planned railroad in Ohio
 Black Diamond Coal Mining Railroad, an abandoned railroad in California
 Black Diamond Equipment, a manufacturer of climbing and outdoor gear
 Black Diamond, a brand name used for various electrical products of the Mitsubishi Corporation
 Black Diamond, the barge whose collision with the steamer ship Massachusetts drowned at least 50 persons, including 4 pursuers of Abraham Lincoln's assassin
 Black Diamond switches, a switch series by Extreme Networks

Films
 The Black Diamond (1922 film), a French silent mystery film
 The Black Diamond (1941 film), a French drama film
 Black Diamonds (1938 film), a Hungarian film directed by Ladislao Vajda
 Black Diamonds (1940 film), an American film directed by Christy Cabanne

Music
 The Black Diamonds, an Australian garage-rock band

Albums
 Black Diamond (Angie Stone album), 1999
 Black Diamond (Buraka Som Sistema album), 2008
 Black Diamond (The Rippingtons album), 1997
 Black Diamond (Stan Ridgway album), 1995
 Black Diamond: The Anthology or the title song (see below), by Stratovarius, 2006
 Black Diamond, by The Groundhogs, 1976
 Black Diamond, by Janet Jackson, upcoming 2020
 Black Diamonds (EP) or the title song, by Issues, 2012

Songs
 "Black Diamond" (Bee Gees song), 1969
 "Black Diamond" (Kiss song), 1974
 "Black Diamond", by Double, 2008
 "Black Diamond", by Roy Brown, 1954
 "Black Diamond", by Stratovarius from Visions, 1997
 "Black Diamonds", by Therion, part of the "Draconian Trilogy" from Vovin, 1998

Places
 Black Diamond (library), nickname of the modern extension of the Royal Danish Library, because of its appearance
 Black Diamond, Arizona, United States
 Black Diamond, Alberta, Canada
 Black Diamond, former name of Pittsburg, California, United States
 Black Diamond, Florida, United States
 Black Diamond, Washington, United States
 Black Diamond Mines Regional Preserve in California, United States, preserving historic coal mines

Sports

People
 Austin Idol, professional wrestler, known as "Black Diamond" and other ring names
 Clinton Morrison (born 1979), Irish/English footballer, known as "Black Diamond"
 Leônidas da Silva, Brazilian footballer, known as "Black Diamond"

Other sports uses
 "Black Diamond" the Bison, mascot for Point Park University
 "Black Diamond", informal use for an inductee of the Aboriginal and Islander Sports Hall of Fame in Australia
 Black Diamond Australian Football League, an Australian rules football competition
 Black Diamond Conference, a high school conference of the Illinois High School Association
 A Black Diamond District, a high school conference of the Virginia High School League
 Black Diamond Trophy, a college football trophy that went to the winner of the annual West Virginia University and Virginia Tech football game
 Double black diamond, a difficulty rating in Alpine skiing

Other uses
 Black Diamond (roller coaster), a roller coaster in Elysburg, Pennsylvania, U.S.
 Black Diamonds (racial term), a controversial term for wealthy black people in South Africa